Two ships of the Royal Australian Navy have been named HMAS Ibis:

A requisitioned vessel operated during World War II
, a Ton-class minesweeper acquired from the Royal Navy in 1969, and operated until 1984

Battle honours
Ships named HMAS Ibis are entitled to carry two battle honours:
Darwin 1942–43
Malaysia 1964

References

Royal Australian Navy ship names